Hilde Lauvhaug ( born 4 April 1989) is a retired Norwegian cross-country skier.

She competed at the 2009 Junior World Championships, winning a gold medal in the relay, and later in the U23 class at the 2010 and 2011 Junior World Championships. She won a silver medal in 2010 and a bronze medal in 2011.

She made her World Cup debut in the 2007–08 season opener at Beitostølen, also collecting her first World Cup points with a 29th place. She later improved to a 22nd place in November 2011 at Sjusjøen; however, the relay race the next day in which she finished 6th was her last World Cup outing.

She represented the sports clubs SFK Lyn.

Cross-country skiing results
All results are sourced from the International Ski Federation (FIS).

World Cup

Season standings

References 

1989 births
Living people
Skiers from Oslo
Norwegian female cross-country skiers